Cercosporella is a fungus genus in the family Mycosphaerellaceae.

Synonyms
 Pseudocercosporella capsellae, synonym for Cercosporella brassicae
 Mycosphaerella areola, synonym for Cercosporella gossypii
 Tapesia yallundae, synonym for Cercosporella herpotrichoides
 Calonectria indusiata, synonym for Cercosporella theae

References

External links
 EPPO codes

Mycosphaerellaceae genera